Eble of Ventadorn or, in French, Ebles de Ventadour is the name of a succession of rulers of a lordship in the Limousin (central France), including:

Eble I of Ventadorn
Eble II of Ventadorn (died 1155), said to have been a troubadour, though none of his poems survive
Eble III of Ventadorn (died 1170), patron of the troubadour Bernart de Ventadorn
Eble IV of Ventadorn
Eble V of Ventadorn (died after 1236), husband of Maria de Ventadorn
Eble VI of Ventadorn